The Spartan DFD Aerotome, or DFS Aerotome Dual, is an American two-seat ultralight trike that was designed and produced by Spartan Microlights.

Design and development
The aircraft was designed as a US FAR 103 Ultralight Vehicles rules two-seat trainer. It features a cable-braced hang glider-style high-wing, weight-shift controls, a two-seats-in-tandem open cockpit, tricycle landing gear and a single engine in pusher configuration.

The aircraft is made from bolted-together aluminum tubing, with its single surface wing covered in Dacron sailcloth. Its  span wing is supported by a single tube-type kingpost and uses an "A" frame control bar. Unlike the Spartan DFS Trike the Aerotome uses only a trike delta wing and cannot be converted for powered parachute use.

The standard engine supplied was the twin cylinder, two-stroke, air-cooled  Rotax 503, with a  fuel tank. When in production it came with optional dual controls, aero-towing hardware, larger engines and  fuel tank. Thirty had been completed and flown by February 2000.

Specifications (Aerotome)

References

1990s United States ultralight aircraft
Single-engined pusher aircraft
Ultralight trikes
Spartan Microlights aircraft